Choi Young-ja (born 30 May 1975) is a former professional tennis player from South Korea.

Biography
A right-handed player from Seoul, Choi began playing tennis at the age of 10. She won her first ITF tournament at Bangkok in 1993 and began touring professionally after graduating from high school in 1994.

At the 1996 Summer Olympics in Atlanta she made the second round of the singles competition, with a win over South Africa's Joannette Kruger, before  she was eliminated by 11th seed Brenda Schultz-McCarthy of the Netherlands.

Choi represented the South Korea Fed Cup team in a total of 16 ties. She was most successful in Fed Cup tennis as a doubles player, losing only one of her 12 matches. In singles she won three rubbers, one of which was against Li Na in 1999.

She won the women's doubles gold medal at the 2002 Asian Games and was also a bronze medalist in the team competition.

ITF finals

Singles (8-12)

Doubles (12-12)

References

External links
 
 
 

1975 births
Living people
South Korean female tennis players
Tennis players at the 1996 Summer Olympics
Olympic tennis players of South Korea
Tennis players at the 2002 Asian Games
Medalists at the 2002 Asian Games
Asian Games gold medalists for South Korea
Asian Games bronze medalists for South Korea
Asian Games medalists in tennis
Tennis players from Seoul
20th-century South Korean women
21st-century South Korean women